William McLean Watson (1874–1962) became Labour MP for Dunfermline Burghs, Scotland, in 1922. He lost his seat in the National Government landslide of 1931, but won it back in 1935 and retained it until 1950.

Before his career in politics, he was a miner and an official in the Scottish miners' union. He first contested the seat unsuccessfully in 1918.

References

External links 
 

1874 births
1962 deaths
Scottish Labour MPs
Scottish miners
Scottish trade unionists
UK MPs 1922–1923
UK MPs 1923–1924
UK MPs 1924–1929
UK MPs 1929–1931
UK MPs 1935–1945
UK MPs 1945–1950
Members of the Parliament of the United Kingdom for Fife constituencies
Miners' Federation of Great Britain-sponsored MPs
National Union of Mineworkers-sponsored MPs